Ubbi, Ubbe or Ubbo was the name of three warriors in Norse mythology and early Scandinavian history.

A legendary Danish champion, see Hrærekr Ringslinger.
Ubba, a ninth century Viking

Ubbo can also refer to:

 Hippo Regius